Ornibactin is a siderophore, or small iron-binding compound secreted by bacteria to transport iron into the cell. Ornibactin is produced by Burkholderia cenocepacia under iron-deficient conditions. B. cenocepacia is known to opportunistically infect humans, specifically ones suffering from cystic fibrosis.

Biosynthesis 
Ornibactin consists of an L-ornithine-D-hydroxyaspartate-L-serine-L-ornithine backbone. It is biosynthesized by 2 non-ribosomal peptide synthetases (NRPSs), OrbI and OrbJ, as indicated in the figure. The domains are as follows: adenylation (A), peptidyl carrier (P), condensation (C), and epimerase (E). The wavy lines in the figure indicate the phosphopantetheine arms to which the amino acid residues are attached via thioester linkages.

References 

Siderophores